The following is a list of notable people from Jersey City, New Jersey, United States.  (B) denotes that the person was born there.

Academics
 Jean Anyon (1941–2013), education researcher who wrote Ghetto Schooling (B)
 Neilson Debevoise (1903–1992), historian of the Parthian Empire (B)
 Robert J. Morris (1914–1996), anti-Communist activist who was President of the University of Dallas and served as chief counsel to the United States Senate Subcommittee on Internal Security

Arts

Literature
 Jim Bishop (1907–1987), writer and journalist (B)
 Ella Barksdale Brown (1871–?), journalist and educator
 Vincent Czyz (born 1963), writer and critic of speculative fiction
 Thomas Fleming (1927–2017), military historian and historical novelist (B)
 Thomas Kiernan (1933-2003), writer known for biographies on individuals including Laurence Olivier, Jane Fonda, John Steinbeck, and Yasser Arafat (B)
 Joseph Krumgold (1908–1980), screenwriter who won two Newbery Awards (B)
 Laura McCullough (born 1960), poet (B)
 Lillian Morrison (1917–2014), poet, author and librarian (B)
 Walter Dean Myers (1937–2014), author of young-adult literature who was a five-time winner of the Coretta Scott King Award
 Michael Shaara (1928–1988), author of the Civil War book, The Killer Angels (B)
 Philip Van Doren Stern (1900–1984), author, editor, and Civil War historian whose 1943 story "The Greatest Gift", inspired the classic Christmas film It's a Wonderful Life (1946)
 Matt Taibbi (born 1970), author and journalist
 Janine Pommy Vega (1942–2010), poet associated with the Beats

Fine arts
 John Bachmann (1814–1896), lithographer who pioneered "bird's-eye view" prints, especially of New York City
 George Catlin (1796–1872), painter, author and traveler who specialized in portraits of Native Americans in the Old West
 Elaine Lustig Cohen (1927–2016), graphic designer, artist and archivist (B)
 Alphaeus Philemon Cole (1876–1988), artist, engraver and etcher; son of engraver Timothy Cole; died at age 112 (B)
 Archimedes Giacomantonio (1906–1988), sculptor who was best known for his busts of noted figures
 Carroll N. Jones III (1944–2017), artist in the style of American realism
 Kaws (born 1974 as Brian Donnelly), graffiti artist, limited-edition clothing and toy designer
 Richard Lahey (1893–1978), artist who competed in the painting event as part of the art competition at the 1932 Summer Olympics(B)
 Alexander Melamid (born 1945), Russian painter
 Herbert Migdoll (born 1944), painter, environmental installation artist and photographer, who has served as the company photographer for The Joffrey Ballet since 1968, and later as its design director (B)
 Chi Modu (-2021), photographer known for his photos of various pioneering hip-hop music entertainers.
 Henriette Simon Picker (1917–2016), painter and fashion designer(B)
 Arthur Secunda (1927–2022), painter, sculptor, and printmaker(B)

Movies, stage, television and modeling
 Nick Adams (1931–1968), actor who appeared in Hollywood films and on television during the 1950s and 1960s
 Elizabeth Allen (1929–2006), stage and screen actress (B)
 Beetlejuice (born 1968), entertainer and Howard Stern Show personality (B)
 Philip Bosco (1930–2018), stage and screen actor who was nominated for a Tony Award in 1996 for Best Actor in Moon Over Buffalo (B)
 Lisa Brown (1954–2021), stage and screen actress known for her roles on Guiding Light and As The World Turns.
 John Calley (1930–2011), movie producer who was nominated for an Oscar for Best Picture in 1993 for The Remains of the Day (B)
Anthony Carrino (born 1978), Kitchen Cousins
 Richard Conte (1910–1975), actor who appeared in The Godfather as Don Barzini (B)
 Danny Dayton (1923–1999), character actor (B)
 Kyan Douglas (born 1970 as Hugh Edward Douglas Jr.), grooming expert who has appeared on Queer Eye for the Straight Guy
 Cirie Fields (born 1970), four-time Survivor contestant who appeared on Survivor: Panama (4th), Survivor: Micronesia (3rd), Survivor: Heroes vs. Villains (17th) and Survivor: Game Changers
 Ruth Findlay (1896–1949), Broadway actress
 Susan Flannery (born 1939), television and screen actress
 Leon Gast (1936–2021), film director, producer, cinematographer and editor best known for his documentary When We Were Kings (B)
 Paul Gleason (1939–2006), film and television actor who appeared in Trading Places, The Breakfast Club and Die Hard (B)
 Paul Guilfoyle (1902–1961), character actor who tries to kill James Cagney in White Heat (B)
 Dennis James (1917–1997), game show host, most notably The Price Is Right, 1972–1977 in syndication
 Herbert Jefferson Jr. (born 1946), film, television and stage actor who appeared in Battlestar Galactica and Rich Man, Poor Man
 Victor Kilian (1891–1979), character actor of the 1930s and 1940s, who later played the libidinous grandfather on Mary Hartman, Mary Hartman (B)
 June Kirby (1928–2022), actress and model
 Nathan Lane (born 1956), Broadway and film actor (B)
Norman Lloyd (1914–2021), actor, producer and director who appeared in Alfred Hitchcock's Saboteur in 1942 and Dead Poets Society in 1989 (B) (B)
 Derek Luke (born 1974), actor who won the Independent Spirit Award for his performance in Antwone Fisher (B)
 Denise Mercedes (born 1991), plus-size fashion model and clothing designer(B)
 Kate Micucci (born 1980), actress, voice actress, comedian, singer-songwriter and artist (B)
 Diane Neal (born 1976), actress who has appeared on Law and Order: SVU
 Ozzie Nelson (1906–1975), bandleader, actor and TV personality, The Adventures of Ozzie and Harriet (B)
 Phyllis Newman (1933–2019), actress and singer (B)
 Patrice O'Neal (1969–2011), stand-up comedian, radio personality and actor
 Cliff Osmond (1937–2012), character actor and television screenwriter best known for appearing in films directed by Billy Wilder (B)
 Sal Piro (1950–2023), actor who was the president of The Rocky Horror Picture Show Fan Club from 1977 until his death  (B)
 Kevin Powell (born 1966), journalist, poet, cast member on first season of MTV reality show The Real World
 Billy Quirk (1873–1926), silent movie actor who appeared in 180 films (B)
 Michelle Rodriguez (born 1978), actress, screenwriter and disc jockey
 Basil Ruysdael (1878–1960), character actor on stage, films and radio and was a star bass-baritone with the Metropolitan Opera Company (B)
 Joseph Sargent (1925–2014), actor, producer and television director who won four Emmy Awards (B)
 Kate Lyn Sheil (born 1985), actress, House of Cards
 Mary Percy Schenck (1917–2005), Tony Award winning costume designer
 William N. Stape (born 1968), screenwriter and magazine writer who wrote episodes of Star Trek: The Next Generation and Star Trek: Deep Space Nine (B)
 Martha Stewart (born 1941), media personality, author, and magazine publisher (B)
 Michael E. Uslan (born 1951), originator and executive producer of the Batman/Dark Knight/Joker movie franchise (B)
 Tony Vlachos (born 1973), winner of the reality TV series Survivor: Cagayan and Survivor: Winners at War
 Tracey Walter (born 1947), character actor who has appeared in over 100 films and television shows (B)
 Malcolm-Jamal Warner (born 1970), actor who appeared on The Cosby Show (B)
 Flip Wilson (1933–1998), comedian, actor, The Flip Wilson Show (B)

Music
 Akon (born 1973), rapper and R&B singer
 Paul Banks (born 1978), lead singer, lyricist and guitarist of the New York City-based band Interpol
 Robert "Kool" Bell (born 1950), musician and founder of Kool & the Gang
 Joe Budden (born 1980), rapper and member of hip hop group Slaughterhouse
 Anthony J. Cirone, percussionist with the San Francisco Symphony under Maestro Josef Krips (B)
 Attrell Cordes (1970–2016), musician, rapper, producer, co-founder and lead vocalist of P.M. Dawn
 Dino Danelli (born 1944), drummer for the 1960s rock group The Rascals (B)
 Leonard De Paur (1914–1998), composer, choral director and arts administrator.
 Al Di Meola (born 1954), jazz fusion guitarist (B)
 Maude Roberts George (1888–1943), singer, arts administrator and music critic, who was president of the National Association of Negro Musicians from 1933 to 1935
 John P. Hammond (born 1942), blues singer and guitarist
 Andrew Hill (1931–2007), jazz pianist and composer
 Hao Huang (born 1957), pianist and music professor (B)
 Kid Buu (born 1988), rapper (B)
 Dave Kikoski (born 1961), jazz pianist and keyboardist
 Ludacris (born 1977), rapper
 Marilyn McCoo (born 1943), singer and one of the five members of The 5th Dimension (B)
 Gil Mellé (1931–2004), recording artist, songwriter, jazz musician and composer whose score for The Andromeda Strain was the first all-electronic film score (B)
 Christina Milian (born 1981), actress and recording artist (B)
Queen Latifah (born 1970 as Dana Elaine Owens), singer, rapper musician, producer, actor and from 1996 through 2015 based Flavor Unit Entertainment in the city
 Frank Sinatra (1915–1998), singer and actor who resided in Jersey City after his marriage to Nancy Barbato
 Frank Sinatra Jr. (1944–2016), singer and conductor (B)
 Nancy Sinatra (born 1940), singer and actress (B)
 Claydes Charles Smith (1946–2006), co-founder and lead guitarist of Kool & the Gang (B)
 Dennis "Dee Tee" Thomas (1951–2021), alto saxophone player, flautist, and percussionist, who was a founding member of R&B/soul/funk Kool & the Gang
Florence Turner-Maley (1871–1926), composer and singer
 Maury Yeston (born 1945), composer, lyricist, educator and musicologist

Business and industry
 Myril Axelrod Bennett (1920–2014), an early female executive in the advertising industry
 George Louis Bettcher (1862–1952), architect based in Denver, Colorado  (B)
 Curtis Blake (1917–2019), businessman who was the co-founder of the Friendly Ice Cream Corporation (B)
 Patricia Morgan (1939–1986?), businesswoman, former sex worker, and trans woman (B)
 Irving Naxon (1902–1989), engineer and inventor, who is best known for patenting the slow cooker  (B)
 Bill Perkins (born 1969), hedge fund manager

Government, politics, law, activism and religion
 Nick Acocella (1943–2020), political journalist and author  (B)
 Gabriel M. Ambrosio (1938–2013), politician who served in the New Jersey Senate, representing the 36th Legislative District (B)
 Raymond A. Brown (1915–2009), attorney whose clients included Black Liberation Army member Assata Shakur, boxer Rubin "Hurricane" Carter and "Dr. X" physician Mario Jascalevich
 Robert Burns (1926–2016), politician who served two terms in the New Jersey General Assembly from the 38th Legislative District (B)
 Charles J. Catrillo (1945–2004), politician who served in the New Jersey General Assembly from the 32nd Legislative District from 1986 to 1988 (B)
 Orestes Cleveland (1829–1896), Mayor of Jersey City 1864–1867 and 1886–1892, who served in the United States House of Representatives from New Jersey's 5th congressional district, 1869–1871
 Leonard T. Connors (1929–2016), politician who served in the New Jersey Senate, 1982–2008 representing the 9th Legislative District; Mayor of Surf City, New Jersey, 1966–2015 (B)
 Glenn Cunningham (1943–2004), first African-American mayor of Jersey City (B)
 Edward M. Daly (born 1965), four-star general in the United States Army who serves as the 20th commanding general of the U.S. Army Materiel Command
 William Davis Daly (1851–1900), member of the U.S. House of Representatives from 1899 to 1900 (B)
 Dominick V. Daniels (1908–1987), member of the U.S. House of Representatives from 1959–1977 (B)
 William DeNoble (1924–2007), labor organizer (B)
 Harriet E. Derman (born 1943), politician who was elected to two terms in the New Jersey General Assembly and served as head of the New Jersey Department of Community Affairs  (B)
 Edward I. Edwards (1863–1931), politician who was the 37th Governor of New Jersey; served in the United States Senate 1923–1929
 Angelou Ezeilo (born 1965), social entrepreneur and environmental activist
 Bayard H. Faulkner (1894–1983), Mayor of Montclair, New Jersey, and chairman of the 1950 Commission on Municipal Government that created the Faulkner Act, named in his honor.
 George Bragg Fielder (1842–1906), represented New Jersey's 7th congressional district in the United States House of Representatives from 1893 to 1895. Father of James Fairman Fielder (B)
 James Fairman Fielder (1867–1954), 35th Governor of New Jersey 1914–1917 (B)
 Glen Ford (1949–2021), journalist, socialist, co-founder of the America's Black Forum and Black Agenda Report (B)
 Louis Freeh (born 1950), Director of the Federal Bureau of Investigation, 1993–2001 (B)
 David Friedland (1937–2022), former member of the New Jersey Senate, convicted of racketeering after faking his death
 Marie L. Garibaldi (1934–2016), lawyer who served as Associate Justice of the New Jersey Supreme Court (B)
 Cornelius "Cornbread" Givens (1931–2008), civil rights leader who became the first African American to run for mayor of a major US city, when he ran for office in Jersey City
 Edward W. Gray (1870–1942), member of the U.S. House of Representatives, 1915–1919 (B)
 J. Owen Grundy (1912–1985), Jersey City's official historian (B)
 Frank Joseph Guarini (born 1924), member of the U.S. House of Representatives, 1993–1999 (B)
 Frank Hague (1876–1956), long-time mayor of Jersey City (B)
 James A. Hamill (1877–1941), member of the U.S. House of Representatives, 1907–1921 (B)
 Edward J. Hart (1893–1961), member of the U.S. House of Representatives, 1935–1955 (B)
 Frank Herbert (1931–2018), politician who served in the New Jersey Senate and the Bergen County Board of Chosen Freeholders (B)
 Anthony Impreveduto (1948–2009), educator and politician who served in the New Jersey General Assembly from 1988 until 2004, when he resigned following a guilty plea to corruption charges (B)
 John V. Kelly (1926–2009), served in the New Jersey General Assembly (B)
 Walter M. D. Kern (1937–1998), politician who served in the New Jersey General Assembly, 1978–1990, where he represented the 40th Legislative District (B)
 William H. Lash (1961–2006), served from 2001 to 2005 as the Assistant Secretary for Market Access and Compliance at the United States Department of Commerce(B)
 Eugene W. Leake (1877–1959), member of the US House of Representatives, 1907–1909 (B)
 Job H. Lippincott (1842–1900), United States Attorney for the District of New Jersey; Associate Justice of the New Jersey Supreme Court, 1893–1900
 John J. Matheussen (born 1953), politician who served in the New Jersey Senate, 1992–2003, where he represented the 4th Legislative District (B)
 William McAdoo (1853–1930), politician who represented New Jersey's 7th congressional district, 1883–1891; served as New York City Police Commissioner in 1904 and 1905
 Jim McGreevey (born 1957), 52nd Governor of New Jersey (B)
 John Gerald Milton (1881–1977), represented New Jersey in the United States Senate in 1938 (B)
 A. Harry Moore (1877–1952), 39th Governor of New Jersey who was elected to serve three separate non-consecutive terms and also served in the U.S. Senate (B)
 Mike Mrowicki, politician who has served in the Vermont House of Representatives since 2009
 Franklin Murphy (1846–1920), 31st Governor of New Jersey, 1902–1905 (B)
 William Musto (1917–2006), Mayor of Union City, New Jersey, 1962–1970 and 1974–1982 (B)
 Mary Teresa Norton (1875–1959), first woman Democrat elected to the U.S. House of Representatives, served 1925–1951 (B)
 Charles F. X. O'Brien (1879–1940), member of the U.S. House of Representatives, 1921–1925 (B)
 John Joseph O'Hara (born 1946), auxiliary bishop of the Roman Catholic Archdiocese of New York (B)
 Evelyn Padin (born 1960), attorney and a nominee to serve as a United States district judge of the United States District Court for the District of New Jersey(B)
 Bill Perkins (1941–2016), running back in the American Football League for the New York Jets who later became an attorney and politician who served two terms in the New Jersey General Assembly (B)
 Phelps Phelps (1894–1981) 38th Governor of American Samoa and United States Ambassador to the Dominican Republic
 Mary Philbrook (1872–1958), champion of equal rights for women who was the first lawyer admitted to the New Jersey Bar (B)
 Joseph Russoniello (born 1941), two-term U.S. Attorney for the Northern District of California and former Dean of San Francisco Law School
 Alfred Dennis Sieminski (1911–1990), member of the U.S. House of Representatives, 1951–1959 (B)
 Alexander Simpson (1872–1953), journalist, attorney and politician who served in both houses of the New Jersey Legislature and as Assistant Attorney General of New Jersey (B)
 Thomas F. X. Smith (1928–1996), professional basketball player for the New York Knicks in 1951; mayor of Jersey City 1977–1981 (B)
 Edward J. Sparks (1897–1976), diplomat who served as the United States ambassador to Bolivia, Guatemala, Venezuela, and Uruguay. (B)
 Nadine Strossen (born 1950), President of the American Civil Liberties Union, 1991–2008 (B)
 J. Parnell Thomas (1895–1970), member of the United States House of Representatives, 1937–1950 (B)
 Shirley Tolentino (1943–2010), first black woman to serve on New Jersey Superior Court; first black woman appointed to the Jersey City Municipal Court and to serve as its presiding judge (B)
 Harry Lancaster Towe (1898–1977), member of the U.S. House of Representatives, 1943–1951 (B)
 Frank William Towey Jr. (1895–1979), member of the U.S. House of Representatives, 1937–1939 (B)
 Joseph Patrick Tumulty (1870–1954), member of the New Jersey General Assembly and Secretary to the President of the United States under Woodrow Wilson (B)
 Joseph W. Tumulty (1914–1996), attorney and politician who represented the 32nd Legislative District for a single four-year term in the New Jersey Senate
 T. James Tumulty (1913–1981), member of the U.S. House of Representatives, 1955–1957 (B)
 Charles H. Voorhis (1833–1896), member of the United States House of Representatives from New Jersey, 1879–1881
 Jacqueline Walker (born 1941), politician who served in the New Jersey General Assembly 1984–1986
 John C. White (born 1975), Louisiana state superintendent of education since 2012 who taught at William L. Dickinson High School, 1998–2001

Military
 Francis X. Burke (1918–1988), recipient of the Medal of Honor during World War II
 Martin E. Dempsey (born 1952), United States Army general; 18th Chairman of the Joint Chiefs of Staff (B)
 John G. Gertsch (1945–1969), posthumously awarded the Medal of Honor during the Vietnam War
 James Jonas Madison (1884–1922), awarded the Medal of Honor for service in World War I (B)
 John W. Meagher (1917–1996), recipient of the Medal of Honor during World War II
 Charles J. Watters (1927–1967), chaplain who was posthumously awarded the Medal of Honor during the Vietnam War (B)
 George D. Zamka (born 1962), NASA astronaut and Marine Corps pilot who piloted the Space Shuttle Discovery in its 2007 mission to the International Space Station and was commander of mission STS-130 in 2010(B)

Sports
 Rafael Addison (born 1964), retired basketball player who played professionally for the New Jersey Nets and Phoenix Suns
 Walker Lee Ashley (born 1960), retired American football linebacker who played in the National Football League for the Minnesota Vikings and Kansas City Chiefs
 Willie Banks (born 1969), former Major League Baseball pitcher
 Carl Barisich (born 1951), former defensive tackle for nine seasons between 1973 and 1981 for four different NFL teams (B)
 Paul Berezney (1915–1990), offensive tackle who played in the NFL for the Green Bay Packers between 1942 and 1944 (B)
 Pete Berezney (1923–2008), football tackle who played for the Los Angeles Dons and Baltimore Colts (B)
 Bob Bessoir (1932–2020), college basketball coach who spent his career at the University of Scranton, where he won 552 games and two NCAA Division III national championships
 Jim Boylan (born 1955), basketball coach, who served as the interim head coach for the Chicago Bulls for part of the 2007–08 NBA season and as an interim coach for the Milwaukee Bucks for part of the 2012–13 NBA season (B)
 Donald Copeland (born 1984), former professional basketball player who is the head coach of the Wagner Seahawks men's basketball team (B)
 Frank Darby (born 1997), wide receiver for the Atlanta Falcons (B)
 Otis Davis (born 1932), won two gold medals in 400 metre dash and 4 × 400 metres relay at 1960 Summer Olympics, setting a world record in the former event
 Terry Dehere (born 1971), politician, former NBA basketball player
 Dom Flora (1935–2021), All-America basketball player at Washington and Lee University, where he set the team career scoring record
 Arturo Gatti (1972–2009), professional boxer
 Rich Glover (born 1950) former professional football player, who played defensive tackle in the NFL for the New York Giants and Philadelphia Eagles
 Gerald Govan (born 1942), professional basketball player who played in all nine seasons of the original American Basketball Association (B)
 Tom Heinsohn (1934–2020), professional basketball player for the Boston Celtics who was a member of eight NBA Championship teams (1957, 1959–1965) (B)
 Don Holder (1928–2015), gymnast who competed in eight events at the 1952 Summer Olympics (B)
 Lefty Hopper (1874–1959), major league baseball player who pitched in two games in 1898 for the Brooklyn Bridegrooms
 Bobby Hurley (born 1971), professional basketball player who played for the Sacramento Kings and the Vancouver Grizzlies
 Dan Hurley (born 1973), college basketball player and college basketball coach
 Sonny Kiss (born 1993), professional wrestler and dancer
 Johnny Kucks (1932–2013), baseball pitcher for the New York Yankees
 Martin Lang (born 1949), fencer who represented the United States in the individual and team foil events at the 1976 Summer Olympics in Montreal
 Dan Le Batard (born 1968), sportswriter for the Miami Herald and host of The Dan Le Batard Show with Stugotz and Highly Questionable on ESPN
 Ed Lucas (1939–2021), Emmy-winning blind broadcaster on the YES Network for the New York Yankees
 Demie Mainieri (1928–2019), college baseball head coach who was the first junior college coach to win 1,000 career games
 Roshown McLeod (born 1975), played in three NBA seasons, 1999–2001, for the Atlanta Hawks and Philadelphia 76ers
 John McMullen (1918–2005), naval architect and marine engineer, and former owner of the New Jersey Devils and Houston Astros (B)
 J. D. Maarleveld (born 1961), offensive tackle who played in the NFL for the Tampa Bay Buccaneers
 Josh A. Moore (born 1980), former NBA basketball player
 Donald Hugh Nagle, karate Grand Master (B)
 Tony Nicodemo (1936–2004), college basketball player who set several records while playing for Saint Michael's College of Vermont in the late 1950s
 Ahmad Nivins (born 1987), power forward at Saint Joseph's University
 Mike O'Koren (born 1958), member of the North Carolina Tar Heels men's basketball team, professional basketball player and coach
 Shaquille O'Neal (born 1972), professional basketball player, originally from Newark
 George Papas (born 1998), professional basketball player for Olympiacos of the Greek Basket League and the EuroLeague  (B)
 Bernie Parmalee (born 1967), former NFL running back for the Miami Dolphins and New York Jets
 Stanley Poreda (1909–1983), heavyweight boxer in the 1930s (B)
 Rodrick Rhodes (born 1973), professional basketball player who played for the Houston Rockets, Vancouver Grizzlies and Dallas Mavericks (B)
 David Rivers (born 1965), former NBA player for the Los Angeles Lakers (B)
 Terrence Roberts (born 1985), former member of the Syracuse Orange men's basketball team
 José Rosado (born 1974), two-time All-Star pitcher for the Kansas City Royals (B)
 Eddie August Schneider (1911–1940), pilot who set airspeed records
 Walt Singer (1911–1992), end for the New York Giants of the NFL, 1935–1936
 Jim Spanarkel (born 1957), television analyst who played in the NBA for the Philadelphia 76ers and the Dallas Mavericks (B)
 Andy Stanfield (1927–1985), sprinter and Olympic gold and silver medalist
 Paul Tagliabue (born 1940), Commissioner of the National Football League, 1989–2006 (B)
 George Tardiff (1936–2012), football head coach at Benedictine College and Washburn University (B)
 Tyshawn Taylor (born 1990), basketball player for the Brooklyn Nets
 John Valentin (born 1968), played in ten MLB seasons for the Boston Red Sox and New York Mets
 Elnardo Webster (1948–2022), professional basketball player who played in the American Basketball Association for the New York Nets and Memphis Pros during the 1971–1972 season(B)
 Henry Wittenberg (1918–2010), Olympic gold (1948) and silver (1952) medalist, freestyle wrestling (B)
 Warren Wolf (1927–2019), high school football head coach and politician who served as an Ocean County freeholder and a New Jersey State Assemblyman (B)

Criminals
 Mohamed Mahmood Alessa, charged in 2010 with conspiring to join a terrorist group and kill, maim, and kidnap people outside the United States
 Richard Kuklinski (1935–2006), mob hitman
 Louis Manna (born 1929), former consigliere of the Genovese Crime Family
 "Newsboy" Moriarty (1910–1979), ran the numbers game in Hudson County, New Jersey, and left $2.5 million in the trunk of a car while he was in New Jersey State Prison

References

Jersey City